Todd is the fifth album and second double album by American musician Todd Rundgren, released in February 1974 on Bearsville Records. It is the follow-up to the previous year's A Wizard, a True Star and features a comparatively heavier reliance on guitar playing and synthesizers.  About half of the tracks were performed by Rundgren alone, with the other half recorded with varying configurations of musicians. In the US, the album peaked at number 54, while lead single "A Dream Goes On Forever" reached number 69.

Background
In March 1973, Rundgren's fourth album A Wizard, a True Star was released. Recorded at his newly built Secret Sound Studios in Manhattan, Wizards sound and structure was heavily informed by his recent experiments in psychedelic drugs. Critical reception to Wizard was mixed, and according to Rundgren, the album was generally regarded as "professional suicide". In the weeks following the album's release, he produced the New York Dolls' self-titled debut album and Grand Funk Railroad's We're an American Band, which were among the most significant LPs of the year. Rundgren also prepared a technologically ambitious stage show with a new band, Utopia, his first official group since the Nazz. The tour began in April and was cancelled after only a couple weeks on the road.

Once Rundgren was finished with his production duties, he began formulating plans for an improved configuration of Utopia, but first returned to Secret Sound to record the songs that became Todd, which was more material drawing on his hallucinogenic experiences. This time, he had also formed a fascination with religion and spirituality, reading works by authors such as Madame Blavatsky, Rudolf Steiner, and Jiddu Krishnamurti that he found at an occult book store in Lower Manhattan. He said he "started to have a great curiosity about where that psychedelic experience fits into not just my own personal history but the larger history of people's quest for meaning."

Style and production

Compared to Wizard, Todd is a more synthesizer-heavy affair, although it still employs Rundgren's usual selection of guitar, piano, and found sounds (including spoons). Its musical contents range from Gilbert and Sullivan-style show tunes to fusions of Philadelphia soul and progressive rock. Due to the recent success of the "Hello It's Me" single, Rundgren was primarily known as a writer of ballads. In March 1974, he penned an article for Phonograph Record in which he compared Todd to his previous work. He said: "Todd has the least number of ballads, I think, of all the albums I’ve done. It also has more guitar playing. It varies… I do what I feel inspired to do. If I don’t feel like playing that much rock ‘n roll, I don’t need another outlet — another band to play rock and roll." Further, he explained the concept of the record:

Recording for the album lasted from July to August 1973. About half of the tracks were performed by Rundgren alone, with the other half recorded with varying configurations of musicians. It was envisioned as a single-disc album, but became a double album due to the unexpectedly large amount of material that was recorded.  During the making of Todd, Rundgren took note of the "fusion jazz sensibility" between session musicians Kevin Ellman (drums) and John Siegler (bass). Rundgren chose them, along with Moogy Klingman and keyboardist Ralph Schuckett, to be the new configuration of Utopia. This line-up performed their first show at Central Park on August 25, 1973, sharing the bill with the Brecker Brothers and Hall & Oates. The purpose of this show was to record the track "Sons of 1984"; another show was carried out at Griffith Park in Los Angeles to accentuate the recording with overdubs. According to Rundgren: "We went in and taught the audience the lyrics and they sang it. I guess I was a little surprised that it really worked out. ... We were considering doing a whole record that way, as part of our touring show. Teach the audience a song, then record it, and you have a whole album’s worth of these songs from different cities."

Later, he commented of the album, ""my psychedelic adventures were more a part of a spiritual quest to have a greater understanding about the nature of things. As a result, Todd is naturally more orderly, but it also dealt with alternative concepts such as empathy to the point of telepathy. So, on 'I Think You Know,' it's also saying, 'I think at the same moment that you know,' which is the formula for telepathy."

Release
Originally scheduled for release in December 1973, Todd was delayed to the next February due to a vinyl shortage caused by the 1973 oil crisis. The sleeve included a list of names of fans that had sent back the postcard included within the sleeve of A Wizard, a True Star. Utopia played more shows throughout November and December, performing material from Something/Anything? and Wizard after a solo opening set by Rundgren on piano playing along to a pre-recorded track. These shows resumed in March 1974, in support of Todds release, and lasted until May.  "A Dream Goes on Forever", a song originally written for Wizard but recorded for Todd, was issued as lead single.

Reception

Robert Christgau of Creem reviewed: "I've been giving Todd the benefit of the doubt, so now he has to bear a burden of suspicion. On sides one and four ... the useful moments are buried in a mess of electronic studio junk, and even though they manage to pick themselves up from the rubble on sides two and three, that ratio is both uneconomical and unecological. This may well have honest ambitions, which are welcome, but it's too bad they're so self-deluded." Writing in the NME, Nick Kent said, "On first hearing, the album is the most annoying creation I've encountered in an age — all unrelated electroid scribbling, punctuated by a series of songs that sag next to seemingly similar work on Something/Anything and, to a lesser extent the Wizard album." Creems Wayne Robbins similarly felt that the record was too esoteric for most listeners, concluding, "I think through all the noise and the occasional overplayfulness in place of composition, Todd has basically found his tongue. ... He's created a Grand Bouffe for the ears, which is as creatively rewarding to some as it is repulsive to others."

Reviewing the album for Zoo World, Jon Tiven wrote that "for those who claim that Todd's evolution since Something/Anything? has been one long and tedious descent, this critic suggests you give Todd many a listening before you pass judgement. It's an extremely complex and confounding album in terms of both structure and production, and although there may be an unnecessary surplus of wasted space, there's an awful lot of fine material to be found on it." Andrew Tyler, also from NME, felt that Todd was not as good as Wizard and explained, "In some ways Todd is as decisive and brainstorming as Wizard but it's fraught, almost evil ... as though Rundgren bummed out on the whole space celebration riff and wasn't sure what came next. Again we're out in the blue void, but this time you feel like your frozen with no way back."

Retrospectively, Stephen Thomas Erlewine wrote for AllMusic: "These are some major additions to his catalog, but the experiments and the excesses are too tedious to make Todd a necessary listen for anyone but the devoted. But for those listeners, the gems make the rough riding worthwhile." Nicholas Olivier, writing in The Rough Guide to Rock (2003), was less favorable: "One of the dullest double albums ever made, it covered a Gilbert And Sullivan song  alongside a 3000-strong chorus for 'Sons of 1984', and suggested our hero was taking himself far too seriously."

XTC guitarist Dave Gregory became a lifelong Rundgren fan after hearing "The Last Ride" on BBC Radio. As he remembered: "I loved the maverick spirit of the guy. ... He was talented enough to stick a finger up to the industry and say 'This is my record – take it or leave it.'"  "Izzat Love?" was prominently sampled in Neon Indian's "Deadbeat Summer" (2009), while both "The Spark of Life" and "An Elpee's Worth of Toons" were sampled in Charli XCX's "So Far Away" (2013). In 2000, Todd was voted number 1000 in the third edition of Colin Larkin's All Time Top 1000 Albums.

Live performances
In 2010, Rundgren performed Todd and his 1981 album Healing live for the first time. A large video display and lasers were on display throughout the shows with Rundgren and the band dressed in psychedelic costumes.

Track listing

Personnel

Performers

Other credits
 Steve Hammonds – project coordination [uncredited]
 Paul Lester – sleeve notes [uncredited]
 Alen MacWeeney – cover photo
 Bill Klein, Jr. - photography
 Joel Shapiro - photography
 Andrew Pearce – mastering [uncredited]
 Sarah Southin – design [uncredited]

Charts
Todd

"A Dream Goes On Forever"

References

Works cited

External links
 
 
 
 
 

Todd Rundgren albums
1974 albums
Albums produced by Todd Rundgren
Bearsville Records albums
Rhino Records albums